Tessa Polder (born 10 October 1997) is a Dutch volleyball player for ASPTT Mulhouse and the Dutch national team.

She participated at the 2017 Women's European Volleyball Championship.

References

1997 births
Living people
Dutch expatriate sportspeople in Germany
Dutch women's volleyball players
Expatriate volleyball players in Germany
Middle blockers
People from Capelle aan den IJssel
Sportspeople from South Holland
21st-century Dutch women